During the 1993–94 English football season, Reading F.C. competed in the Football League Second Division.

Squad

Left club during season

Transfers

In

Loans In

Out

Released

Competitions

Division two

Results

League table

FA Cup

League Cup

Football League Trophy

Squad statistics

Appearances and goals

|-
|colspan="14"|Players away on loan:
|-
|colspan="14"|Players who appeared for Reading but left during the season:

|}

Goal Scorers

Team kit
Reading's kit for the 1993–94 was manufactured by Pelada, and the main sponsor was Auto Trader.

Notes

References

Soccerbase.com
Reading team stats at Neil Brown

Reading F.C. seasons
Reading